James Harold Strong Jr. (December 12, 1946 – June 4, 2019) is a former American football running back who played three seasons in the National Football League with the San Francisco 49ers and New Orleans Saints. He was drafted by the San Francisco 49ers in the seventh round of the 1970 NFL Draft. He played college football at the University of Houston and attended Sam Houston High School in San Antonio, Texas. He was also a member of the Florida Blazers and San Antonio Wings of the World Football League.

References

External links
Just Sports Stats
College stats
WFL profile

Living people
1946 births
Players of American football from San Antonio
American football running backs
Houston Cougars football players
San Francisco 49ers players
New Orleans Saints players
Florida Blazers players
San Antonio Wings players